This page lists the World Best Year Performance in the year 1991 in the men's decathlon. One of the main events during this season were the 1991 IAAF World Championships in Tokyo, Japan, where the competition started on Thursday August 29, 1991, and ended on Friday August 30, 1991.

Records

1991 World Year Ranking

See also
1991 Hypo-Meeting
1991 Décastar

References
decathlon2000
apulanta
digilander

1991
Decathlon Year Ranking, 1991